Greatest Hits: Live at the Fillmore is Jefferson Starship's second album on the CMC International label, on which their only studio album of the 1990s, Windows of Heaven had been released.  Recorded at the Fillmore Auditorium, the live show aired on television for New Year's Eve 1999, and was later released as this album.

Track listing

Personnel
Paul Kantner - vocals, rhythm guitar
Marty Balin - vocals, acoustic guitar
Jack Casady - bass
Diana Mangano - vocals
Slick Aguilar - lead guitar, background vocals
Chris Smith - keyboards
Prairie Prince  - drums, percussion

References

1999 live albums
CMC International live albums
Jefferson Starship albums